Mecas cineracea is a species of longhorn beetles found in the United States and Mexico. It was described by Thomas Lincoln Casey, Jr. in 1913.

References

Saperdini
Beetles described in 1913
Taxa named by Thomas Lincoln Casey Jr.